The 2018 Birmingham Bowl was a college football bowl game played on December 22, 2018. It was the 13th edition of the Birmingham Bowl, and one of the 2018–19 bowl games concluding the 2018 FBS football season. Sponsored by the Jared brand of Sterling Jewelers, the game was officially named the Jared Birmingham Bowl.

Teams
The bowl was slated to invite teams from the Southeastern Conference (SEC) and the American Athletic Conference (The American). However, with four SEC teams selected for New Year's Six games, the Birmingham Bowl matchup announced on December 2 featured Wake Forest from the Atlantic Coast Conference (ACC), rather than an SEC team, to face Memphis from The American. The two programs previously met four times, each team winning twice, between 1964 and 1967.

Memphis Tigers

Memphis was defeated in the 2018 American Athletic Conference Football Championship Game played on December 1; they received and accepted a bid to the Birmingham Bowl on December 2. The Tigers entered the bowl with a 8–5 record (5–3 in conference).

Wake Forest Demon Deacons

Wake Forest received and accepted a bid to the Birmingham Bowl on December 2. The Demon Deacons entered the bowl with a 6–6 record (3–5 in conference).

Game summary

Scoring summary

Statistics

References

External links

Box score at ESPN

Birmingham Bowl
Birmingham Bowl
Birmingham Bowl
Birmingham Bowl
Memphis Tigers football bowl games
Wake Forest Demon Deacons football bowl games